Durania is a Colombian municipality and town located in the department of Norte de Santander.

Geography 
The municipality is part of the Zulia River watershed. The municipality borders Santiago and San Cayetano in the north, Arboledas and Bochalema in the south, Arboledas, Santiago and Salazar de las Palmas in the west and Bochalema in the east.

History 
The terrain of Durania before the Spanish conquest was inhabited by the Oporoma tribe, possibly a mixture of Carib and Chibcha people, though little is known about this tribe. In those times, Durania functioned as a transport location between the Chitarero and Motilon peoples. Modern Durania was founded on May 1, 1911 by Segundo Antonio Gonzáles and Virginia Acosta de Gonzáles.

References 

1890 establishments in Colombia
Municipalities of the Norte de Santander Department
Populated places established in 1890